Ian Slade (born 1968) is a Welsh international lawn and indoor bowler.

He won a bronze medal in the fours with Dai Wilkins, Mark Anstey and Neil Rees at the 1998 Commonwealth Games in Kuala Lumpur.

Four years later he repeated the feat by winning another bronze in the fours with Richard Bowen, Jason Greenslade and Dai Wilkins at the 2002 Commonwealth Games in Manchester.

References

Living people
1968 births
Commonwealth Games bronze medallists for Wales
Bowls players at the 1998 Commonwealth Games
Bowls players at the 2002 Commonwealth Games
Welsh male bowls players
Commonwealth Games medallists in lawn bowls
Medallists at the 1998 Commonwealth Games
Medallists at the 2002 Commonwealth Games